The longest fence in the world can refer to:
The Dingo Fence of south-east Australia,  finished in 1885
The Rabbit-proof fence of Western Australia, completed in 1907